Philip G. Cochran Memorial United Methodist Church is a historic Methodist church building located in Dawson, Fayette County, Pennsylvania, United States. It was built by Sarah B. Cochran between 1922 and 1927, and is a cruciform solid stone structure in the Late Gothic Revival style. It measures 130 feet by 161 feet. It features a crossing tower and steeple.

It was listed on the National Register of Historic Places in 1982.  It is located in the Dawson Historic District.

See also
 Fayette County, Pennsylvania
 Jumonville
 Linden Hall
 Sarah B. Cochran

References

External links
 Western PA Conference of the UMC

Churches completed in 1927
20th-century Methodist church buildings in the United States
Gothic Revival church buildings in Pennsylvania
Churches on the National Register of Historic Places in Pennsylvania
United Methodist churches in Pennsylvania
Churches in Fayette County, Pennsylvania
National Register of Historic Places in Fayette County, Pennsylvania